

Laffer is a locality in the Australian state of South Australia located in the state’s south-east about  south-east of the state capital of Adelaide and about  west of the municipal seat in Bordertown.

Its boundaries were created on 24 August 2000.  Its name is derived from the cadastral unit of the Hundred of Laffer which it occupies along with the locality of Mount Charles.

Land use within Laffer is ’primary production’.  This includes land at the locality’s southern boundary which is occupied by the protected area known as the Gum Lagoon Conservation Park.

The 2016 Australian census which was conducted in August 2016 reports that Laffer had a population of 48 people.

Laffer is located within the federal division of Barker, the state electoral district of MacKillop and the local government area of the Tatiara District Council.

References

  

Towns in South Australia
Limestone Coast